The siege of Wasit involved the army of the Abbasid Revolution under al-Hasan ibn Qahtaba and the future Caliph al-Mansur, and the Umayyad garrison of Wasit under the last Umayyad governor of Iraq, Yazid ibn Umar ibn Hubayra. Yazid had been forced to abandon Kufa due to a rebellion by Abbasid sympathizers, and fled to Wasit, where he was besieged for 11 months, from August/September 749 to his surrender in June/July 750. The siege was marked by constant sallies and attacks, but as it progressed, the Umayyad garrison's morale collapsed and the internal divisions among the Qays and Yaman tribes began to manifest themselves. After news of the defeat of the Umayyad Caliph Marwan II at the Battle of the Zab and the Abbasid conquest of Syria arrived at Wasit, defections began. Yazid nevertheless held out for a few more months, until he received a pardon for himself and his followers from the Abbasid Caliph al-Saffah. Nevertheless, Yazid and his senior officers were executed soon after on al-Saffah's orders.

Sources 
 
 

749
750
Wasit
Wasit
Wasit
Wasit
Iraq under the Umayyad Caliphate
8th century in the Abbasid Caliphate
Abbasid Revolution